Mere Beck Meadows, formerly known as Willoughby Hall Meadows, is a Site of Special Scientific Interest in the Teesdale district of County Durham, England. It consists of three hay meadows, situated on the south side of Hury Reservoir, immediately below the Blackton Reservoir dam.

The site is important as preserving a rich assemblage of plant species, in a habitat that is becoming increasingly scarcer as a result of intensive agricultural practices. A wide variety of flowering plants is found, many in abundance, such as wood cranesbill, Geranium sylvaticum, meadow saxifrage, Saxifraga granulata, melancholy thistle, Cirsium helenioides, and great burnet, Sanguisorba officinalis.

References

Sites of Special Scientific Interest in County Durham
Meadows in County Durham